Gladys Eileen Marley (née Pidgeon, 21 March 1906 − 19 November 2002) was a New Zealand swimmer, who represented her country at the 1930 British Empire Games in Hamilton, Ontario.

Born in Dunedin in 1906, Marley was the daughter of Arthur Pidgeon and his wife Jane Dickenson Ross. She grew up in Sawyers Bay, Whanganui, Palmerston North and Auckland; her father worked with the railways and consequently the family moved around the country. After leaving Palmerston North Girls' High School, Marley began working as a clerk at the Milne & Choyce department store in Auckland, aged 14.

She was the New Zealand 220 yards breaststroke champion every year from 1925 and 1931, except in 1929 when she was second to Lily Copplestone. Marley was the only female member of the New Zealand team that travelled to the first British Empire Games in Canada in 1930, and was only allowed to go after her mother agreed to pay her own way to chaperone her daughter. Although recording a personal best, she finished sixth in the final of the 200 yards breaststroke, which was won by Cecelia Wolstenholme of England in world-record time.

She retired from swimming after the 1931 national championships, and married Ken Marley, a police constable, at St David's Presbyterian church on Khyber Pass Road, Auckland, the following year. The couple went on to have two children.

Marley died in Wellington in 2002, and her ashes were buried in Kelvin Grove Cemetery, Palmerston North.

References

1906 births
2002 deaths
Swimmers from Dunedin
People educated at Palmerston North Girls' High School
New Zealand female swimmers
Female breaststroke swimmers
Commonwealth Games competitors for New Zealand
Swimmers at the 1930 British Empire Games
Burials at Kelvin Grove Cemetery